Hararghe  ( Harärge; Harari: ሀረርጌይ Harärgeyi, Oromo: Harargee) was a province of eastern Ethiopia with its capital in Harar.

History
Hararghe translates to "land of the Hararis". The region consisted mostly of the territory of the Emirate of Harar annexed by Menelik II in 1887. Including Ethiopia's part of the Ogaden, Haraghe was bounded on west by Shewa, northwest by Wollo Province, northeast by French Somaliland and Somaliland, and on the east by Somalia. Originally however Hararghe included the Sidamo, Bale and Arsi Province until Haile Selassie split the provinces. Hararghe was the historical homeland of the Harla people and often synonymous with the region of Adal.

Hararghe was altered as a result of Proclamation 1943/1, which created twelve taklai ghizats from the existing 42 provinces of varying sizes. A comparison of the two maps in Margary Perham, The Government of Ethiopia shows that Hararghe was created by combining the Sultanate of Aussa, the lands of the Karanle, Ogaden, Issa, and Gadabursi with the 1935 provinces of Chercher and Harar.

In 1960, the province south of the Shebelle River was made into its own province, Bale. With the adoption of the new constitution in 1995, Hararghe was divided between the Oromia, Afar and Somali Regions,which was given a large part, and what remained was a tiny Harari.

See also
 History of Ethiopia

References 

Provinces of Ethiopia
States and territories disestablished in 1995